Inti Muñoz Santini (born 4 January 1974) is a Mexican politician affiliated with the Party of the Democratic Revolution. As of 2014 he served as Deputy of the LIX Legislature of the Mexican Congress in a proportional representation.

References

1974 births
Living people
People from Chihuahua City
Members of the Chamber of Deputies (Mexico)
Party of the Democratic Revolution politicians
Politicians from Chihuahua (state)
21st-century Mexican politicians
Deputies of the LIX Legislature of Mexico